Einsley Delmer "Del" Berg (December 20, 1915 – February 28, 2016) was an American soldier and union organizer who volunteered to serve with the XV International Brigade (nicknamed the Abraham Lincoln Brigade) during the Spanish Civil War. He was the last known surviving veteran of the Abraham Lincoln Brigade.

Early life and education
Born in Anaheim, California, Berg was originally a farmer, but was inspired to enlist when he saw a sign indicating that the government was looking for people to fight fascism. Berg briefly trained with the Oregon National Guard prior to going to Spain in 1937. He served in the United States Army during World War II and was stationed at Morotai Island. He became a member of the Communist Party of the United States while in a Spanish hospital, while recuperating from a shrapnel wound to his liver. He remained an interested and active party member up to the time of his last interview in 2014.

Career
In the years following his demobilization, Berg returned to work the farm on which he had been raised. He fathered two sons from two different marriages. He began serving as a union organizer in the 1950s, and, in a 2007 interview, described the steps he took to discourage the attention of Federal Bureau of Investigation agents. Berg became an official of the National Association for the Advancement of Colored People (NAACP), when he was elected the Vice President of the Stanislaus County branch. In the 1950s during the Red Scare, he was often harassed.  In a 2007 interview with the Union Democrat, Berg described delivering a petition to the racist county sheriff, demanding his resignation. Berg described testifying at a hearing in Washington, D.C. on farm conditions as a representative of the Agricultural Workers Organizing Committee.

As his comrades died Berg was sought out for more frequent interviews. Berg's decision to volunteer to travel to a foreign country to fight fascism has been described as symbolic and inspirational. He was interviewed for an episode of the PBS show History Detectives to provide background about the experience of American volunteers when a segment was focused around an artifact from the Spanish Civil War. As of 2007, Berg lived in Columbia, California. He became a centenarian in December 2015 and died on February 28, 2016, aged 100, in Columbia, California.

On March 25, 2016, approximately a month after Berg's death, United States Senator John McCain published an op-ed in The New York Times saluting him and his comrades, who had fought for the values they believed in, in Spain, and when they returned home to the U.S.

References

External links
 

1915 births
2016 deaths
People from Anaheim, California
People from Columbia, California
Members of the Communist Party USA
Oregon National Guard personnel
Abraham Lincoln Brigade members
United States Army personnel of World War II
Military personnel from California
American centenarians
Men centenarians
NAACP activists
United Farm Workers people
Foreign volunteers in the Spanish Civil War
International Brigades personnel
American people of the Spanish Civil War
Activists from California
American communists
Communists from California